The 1937 USC Trojans football team represented the University of Southern California (USC) in the 1937 college football season. In their 13th year under head coach Howard Jones, the Trojans compiled a 4–4–2 record (2–3–2 against conference opponents), finished in seventh place in the Pacific Coast Conference, and outscored their opponents by a combined total of 136 to 98.

Schedule

References

USC
USC Trojans football seasons
USC Trojans football